The Durango class is an offshore patrol vessel class in service with the Mexican Navy. The Durango class, comprising four ships, was designed and constructed in Mexico in 1999–2000. The class entered service in 2000 and is used primarily for drug interdiction and patrol.

Description
The Durango-class design is based on the s but with a different superstructure. For electrical power, the Durango class are equipped with two 260 kilowatt generators and one 190 kW generator.

The ships mount an Alenia 2 combat data system and Saab EOS 450 optronic director for fire control. They are equipped with air and surface search radar. The Durango class has a complement of 74 including 10 officers with the capability to transport 55 additional personnel. The vessels also mount a helicopter deck over the stern and a hangar and are capable of operating one medium helicopter.

Ships

Construction and service
The four ships of the class were ordered as a follow on to the s on 1 June 1998. Their design was derived from the Holzinger class and are slightly larger than the Sierra class. Durango and Sonora were based at Guaymas in 2009 and Guanajuato and Veracruz at Coatzacoalcos. The ships are primarily used for drug interdiction and patrol. In 2017 Durango took part in the multi-national naval exercise UNITAS 2017.

Notes

Citations

Sources

 
 
 

Patrol vessels of the Mexican Navy
Patrol ship classes
 
Ships built in Mexico